Mokarrabi (also Romanized as Mokarrabī and Mokarrebī; also known as Makrebi Asdollah Khan) is a village in Tork-e Gharbi Rural District, Jowkar District, Malayer County, Hamadan Province, Iran. At the 2006 census, its population was 73, in 12 families.

References 

Populated places in Malayer County